Dmitry Gusev (born 23 July 1972, Yekaterinburg) is a Russian professional campaign manager and a deputy of the 8th State Duma.

After graduating from the Ural State University, Gusev, together with Oleg Matveychev, Rinat Khaseev, and Sergey Chernakov founded the political consulting agency Bakster group, within the framework of which he organized over 200 election campaigns. From 1996 to 2001, he served as deputy of the City Duma of Yekaterinburg. In 2014, he started working at the government of Moscow. In 2015, Gusev became the advisor to the Chairman of the Moscow City Duma. In February 2021, he was appointed the head of the central apparatus of the party A Just Russia — For Truth. In September 2021, he was elected deputy of the 8th State Duma from the Krasnodar Krai constituency.

Gusev is considered to be one of the best Russian campaign managers.

References 

 

1972 births
Living people
A Just Russia
21st-century Russian politicians
Eighth convocation members of the State Duma (Russian Federation)
People from Yekaterinburg